Burton is a village in the West Lindsey district of Lincolnshire, England, and situated approximately  north from the city and county town of Lincoln. The village sits on the side of the Lincoln Cliff overlooking the River Trent Valley. The population at the 2011 census was 625.

Burton Grade II listed Anglican church is dedicated to St Vincent.

References

External links
 
 
 The Burton Hunt

Villages in Lincolnshire
Civil parishes in Lincolnshire
West Lindsey District